{{Infobox pharaoh
| name=Senusret III 
| alt_name= Sesostris III, Senwosret III 
| image=ThreeStatuesOfSesotrisIII-RightProfiles-BritishMuseum-August19-08.jpg
| caption=Statues of Senusret III in the British Museum
| nomen_hiero=F12-s-D21:t-z:n
| nomen=SenusretS(j)-n-WsrtMan of Wosret
| prenomen_hiero=ra-N28-D28*D28:D28 
| prenomen=KhakaureḪˁj-k3w-RˁThe Kas of Ra have appeared
| reign=39 years, spanning from 1878 – 1839 BC 
| predecessor=Senusret II 
| successor=Amenemhat III 
| dynasty=Twelfth Dynasty 
| death_date= 1839 BC
| monuments=Buhen and Toshka
| horus_hiero=nTr-xpr-w 
| horus=NetjerkheperuNṯrj-ḫprwHorus, divine of form 
| nebty_hiero=nTr-ms-w-t 
| nebty=NetjermesutNṯrj-mswtThe two ladies, divine of birth 
| golden_hiero=xpr-G8
| golden=KheperBjk-nbw-ḫprThe golden Horus has been created 
| father=Senusret II
| mother=Khnemetneferhedjet I
| spouse=Neferthenut, Khnemetneferhedjet II, Itakayt, perhaps Meretseger
| children=Amenemhat III, Khnemet, Menet, Mereret, Senetsenebtysy, Sithathor (?)
| burial = Uncertain, possibly  his pyramid at Dahshur or in his tomb at Abydos near the town of Wah-Sut
}}
Khakaure Senusret III (also written as Senwosret III or the hellenised form, Sesostris III) was a pharaoh of Egypt. He ruled from 1878 BC to 1839 BC during a time of great power and prosperity, and was the fifth king of the Twelfth Dynasty of the Middle Kingdom. He was a great pharaoh of the Twelfth Dynasty and is considered to be, perhaps, the most powerful Egyptian ruler of the dynasty. Consequently, he is regarded as one of the sources for the legend about Sesostris. His military campaigns gave rise to an era of peace and economic prosperity that reduced the power of regional rulers and led to a revival in craftwork, trade, and urban development. Senusret III was among the few Egyptian kings who were deified and honored with a cult during their own lifetime.

 Family 

Senusret III was the son of Senusret II and Khenemetneferhedjet I, also called Khenemetneferhedjet I Weret (the elder). Three wives of Senusret III are known for certain. These are Itakayt, Khenemetneferhedjet II and Neferthenut, all three mainly known from their burials next to the pyramid of the king at Dahshur. Several daughters are known, although they also are attested only by the burials around the king's pyramid and their exact relation to the king is disputable. These include Sithathor, Menet, Senetsenebtysy, and Meret. Amenemhat III was most likely a son of the king. Other sons are not known.

Initiatives

Senusret III cleared a navigable canal through the first cataract of the Nile River, (this was different from the Canal of the Pharaohs, which apparently, Senusret III also tried to build). He also relentlessly pushed his kingdom's expansion into Nubia (from 1866 to 1863 BC) where he erected massive river forts including Buhen, Semna, Shalfak and Toshka at Uronarti.

He carried out at least four major campaigns into Nubia in his Years 8, 10, 16, and 19. His Year 8 stela at Semna documents his victories against the Nubians, through which he is thought to have made safe the southern frontier, preventing further incursions into Egypt. Another great stela from Semna dated to the third month of Year 16 of his reign mentions his military activities against both Nubia and Canaan. In it, he admonished his future successors to maintain the new border that he had created:

The Sebek-khu Stele, dated to the reign of Senusret III (reign: 1878 – 1839 BC), records the earliest known Egyptian military campaign in the Levant. The text reads "His Majesty proceeded northward to overthrow the Asiatics. His Majesty reached a foreign country of which the name was Sekmem (...) Then Sekmem fell, together with the wretched Retenu", where Sekmem (s-k-m-m) is thought to be Shechem and "Retenu" or "Retjenu" are associated with ancient Syria.

His final campaign, which was in his Year 19, was less successful because the king's forces were caught with the Nile being lower than normal and they had to retreat and abandon their campaign in order to avoid being trapped in the hostile Nubian territory.
 
Such was his forceful nature and immense influence that Senusret III was worshipped as a deity in Semna by later generations. Jacques Morgan, in 1894, found rock inscriptions near Sehel Island documenting his digging of a canal. Senusret III erected a temple and town in Abydos, and another temple in Medamud.

His court included the viziers Nebit, and Khnumhotep. Ikhernofret worked as treasurer for the king at Abydos. Sobekemhat was treasurer too and buried at Dahshur. Senankh cleared the canal at Sehel for the king. Horkherty was king's acquaintance.

Length of reign

A double-dated papyrus in the Berlin Museum shows Year 20 of his reign next to Year 1 of his son, Amenemhat III; generally, this is presumed to be a proof for a coregency with his son, which should have been started in this year. According to Josef W. Wegner, a Year 39 hieratic control note was recovered on a white limestone block from:

Wegner stresses that it is unlikely that Amenemhat III, Senusret's son and successor, would still be working on his father's temple nearly four decades into his own reign. He notes that the only possible explanation for the block's existence at the project is that Senusret III had a 39-year reign, with the final 20 years in coregency with his son Amenemhat III. Since the project was associated with a project of Senusret III, his Regnal Year was presumably used to date the block, rather than Year 20 of Amenemhat III. Wegner interprets this as an implication that Senusret was still alive in the first two decades of his son's reign.

Wegner's hypothesis is rejected by some scholars, such as Pierre Tallet and Harco Willems; according to them, it is more likely that such a coregency never occurred, and that the Year 39 control note still refers to Amenemhat III, who may have ordered some additions to Senusret's monuments.

Pyramid and complex

Senusret's pyramid complex was built north-east of the Red Pyramid of Dashur. It far surpassed those from the early twelfth dynasty in size, grandeur, and underlying religious conceptions.

There has been speculation that Senusret was not necessarily buried there, but rather, in his sophisticated funerary complex in Abydos and his pyramid more likely being a cenotaph.

Senusret's pyramid is 105 meters square and 78 meters high. The total volume was approximately 288,000 cubic meters. The pyramid was built of a core of mud bricks. They were not made a consistent size implying that standardized moulds were not used. The burial chamber was lined with granite. Above the vaulted burial chamber was a second relieving chamber that was roofed with five pairs of limestone beams each weighing 30 tons. Above this was a third mudbrick vault.

The pyramid complex included a small mortuary temple and seven smaller pyramids for his queens. There is also an underground gallery with further burials for royal women. Here were found the treasures of Sithathor and queen Mereret. There was also a southern temple, however this has since been destroyed.

Royal statuary

Senusret III is well known for his distinctive statues, which are almost immediately recognizable as his. On them, the king is depicted at different ages and, in particular, on the aged ones he sports a strikingly somber expression: the eyes are protruding from hollow eye sockets with pouches and lines under them, the mouth and lips have a grimace of bitterness, and the ears are enormous and protruding forward. In sharp contrast with the even-exaggerated realism of the head and, regardless of his age, the rest of the body is idealized as forever young and muscular, in the more classical pharaonic fashion.

Scholars could only make assumptions about the reasons why Senusret III chose to have himself portrayed in such a unique way, and polarized on two diverging opinions. Some argue that Senusret wanted to be represented as a lonely and disenchanted ruler, human before divine, consumed by worries and by his responsibilities. At the opposite, other scholars suggested that the statues originally would convey the idea of a dreadful tyrant able to see and hear everything under his strict control.

More recently, it has been suggested that the purpose of such peculiar portraiture was not to represent realism, but rather, to reveal the perceived nature of royal power at the time of Senusret's reign.

 Gallery 

Trivia
Senusret is a major character in Christian Jacq's historical fiction series The Mysteries of Osiris.

Some biblical scholars consider Senusret the pharaoh mentioned in Genesis 39-47, who elevated Joseph to a high administrative post, answerable directly to him.

See also
List of pharaohs

References

Bibliography
 W. Grajetzki, The Middle Kingdom of Ancient Egypt: History,Archaeology and Society'', Duckworth, London 2006 , 51-58.
 Josef Wegner, The Nature and Chronology of the Senwosret III–Amenemhat III Regnal Succession: Some Considerations based on new evidence from the Mortuary Temple of Senwosret III at Abydos, JNES 55, Vol.4, (1996), p. 249–279.

External links

 Stela of Senusret III from Deir el-Bahri (hieroglyphic text in russian web-site)
Colchis

 
19th-century BC deaths
19th-century BC Pharaohs
Pharaohs of the Twelfth Dynasty of Egypt
Year of birth unknown